Naddafiyeh (also Romanized as Naddāfīyeh) is a village in Mollasani Rural District, in the Central District of Bavi County, Khuzestan Province, Iran. At the 2006 census, its population was 2,429, in 548 families.

References 

Populated places in Bavi County